Consort Sun may refer to:

China
Princess Sun ( 409), wife of Feng Ba (Emperor Wencheng of Northern Yan)
Noble Consort Cheng Mu (1343–1374), concubine of the Hongwu Emperor
Empress Sun ( 1399–1462), wife of the Xuande Emperor

Korea
Royal Consort Sunbi Heo (1271–1335), wife of Chungseon of Goryeo
Royal Consort Sunbi No (died 1394), wife of Gongyang of Goryeo
Deposed Crown Princess Bong (1414–?), wife of Munjong of Joseon before he took the throne

See also
Lady Sun ( 209–211), spouse of Liu Bei before he took the throne